Cryptanthus argyrophyllus is a plant species in the genus Cryptanthus. This species is endemic to Brazil.

Cultivars
 Cryptanthus 'Andromeda'
 Cryptanthus 'Kaleidoscope'

References

BSI Cultivar Registry Retrieved 11 October 2009

argyrophyllus
Flora of Brazil